DPI-287 is an opioid drug that is used in scientific research. It is a highly selective agonist for the δ-opioid receptor, which produces less convulsions than most drugs from this family. It has antidepressant-like effects.

References 

Synthetic opioids
Delta-opioid receptor agonists
Benzamides
Piperazines
Phenols